The Acaridae are a family of mites in order Sarcoptiformes.

Distribution 
There are several acarid genera with cosmopolitan distributions, such as Acarus, Sancassania and Tyrophagus. There are even Tyrophagus found in Antarctica and (spacecraft in) low Earth orbit.

Ecology 
Acaridae live in various habitats and have various diets. 

Many are generalists that live in natural (e.g. soil, litter, animal nests, decomposing plant material) and artificial (e.g. human dwellings, granaries, greenhouses, plant nurseries) environments. They feed on decomposing organic material, fungi and nematodes.

There are also more specialised acarids. Some Acarus inhabit nests of warm-blooded animals, mostly rodents and birds. Within Sancassania, there are species associated with certain bees, associated with scarabaeid beetles (riding phoretically on live beetles and feeding on dead beetles) or feeding on mushrooms. A lineage of Tyrophagus, comprising T. formicetorum and related species, only occurs in ant nests. A number of Histiogaster species live beneath bark (subcortical) and feed on fungi.

Dispersal 
Various Acaridae have a phoretic deutonymph stage in their life cycle, a non-feeding nymph stage that can disperse to new habitats by riding on larger animals. Hyperphoresy (riding an animal which is itself riding a third animal) has also been reported, with acarid deutonymphs on a larger Uropodidae mite which in turn was on a beetle.

Most Tyrophagus species do not form deutonymphs (except for the T. formicetorum lineage), instead dispersing as feeding life stages. They may disperse phoretically, by active movements or by air currents.

Pests 
Some Acaridae species are stored product pests, such as Acarus siro, A. farris, Tyrophagus putrescentiae, Tyrophagus longior and Tyrolichus casei. These infest stored organic materials such as grains, flour, dried fruit, milk products, hams, cheeses, straw, animal hides, invertebrate culture media, vertebrate bedding materials and animal feed. They thrive in humid conditions and on damp materials. Acaridae can cause dermatitis via piercing human skin (in attempts to feed) or via contact allergens.

There are also Acaridae which are pests of living plants. These include the genus Rhizoglyphus (pests of plants with bulbs) and the species T. longior (pest of some ornamental plants).

Genera

Fagacarinae Fain & R. A. Norton, 1979
 Fagacarus Fain & R. A. Norton, 1979

Acarinae Nesbitt, 1945
 Acarus Linnaeus, 1758
 Aleuroglyphus Zachvatkin, 1940
 Ebertia Oudemans, 1924
 Podoglyphus Oudemans, 1937
 Tyrolichus Oudemans, 1924
 Tyroglyphites Pampaloni, 1902
 Tyrophagus Oudemans, 1924

Rhizoglyphinae Zakhvatkin, 1941
 Acarotalpa Volgin, 1966
 Acotyledon Oudemans, 1903
 Caloglyphus Berlese, 1923
 Cosmoglyphus Oudemans, 1932
 Froriepia Vitzthum, 1919
 Garsaultia Oudemans, 1916
 Histiogaster Berlese, 1883
 Horstia Oudemans, 1905
 Mycetoglyphus Oudemans, 1932
 Myrmoglyphus Vitzthum, 1935
 Rhizoglyphus Claparédè, 1869
 Sancassania Oudemans, 1916
 Schwiebea Oudemans, 1916
 Stereoglyphus Berlese, 1923
 Thyreophagus Rondani, 1874
 Troglocoptes Fain, 1966
 Valmontia Oudemans, 1923
 Viedebanttia Oudemans, 1929

Pontoppidaniinae Oudemans, 1925
 Diphtheroglyphus Nesbitt, 1950
 Pontoppidania Oudemans, 1923

Incertae sedis
 Aellenella S. Mahunka, 1978
 Apiacarus Volgin, 1974
 Amphicalvolia Türk, 1963
 Armacarus S. Mahunka, 1979
 Askinasia Yunker, 1970
 Australhypopus Fain & Friend, 1984
 Baloghella Mahunka, 1963
 Bembidioglyphus Klimov, 1998
 Boletacarus V. I. Volgin & S. V. Mironov, 1980
 Boletoglyphus Volgin, 1953
 Bromeliaglyphus H. H. J. Nesbitt, 1985
 Calvoliella Samsinak, 1969
 Calvoliopsis Mahunka, 1973
 Capillaroglyphus Klimov, 1998
 Carabidobius Volgin, 1953
 Cerophagopsis Zachvatkin, 1941
 Chibidaria Sasa, 1952
 Contromelisia Samsinak, 1969
 Ctenocolletacarus Fain, 1984
 Diadasiopus OConnor, 1997
 Dynastopus Fain, 1978
 Ewingia Pearse, 1929
 Fainoglyphus S. Mahunka, 1979
 Forcellinia Oudemans, 1924
 Ghanacarus Mahunka, 1973
 Halictacarus Mahunka, 1975
 Heteroglyphus Foa, 1897
 Hoogstraalacarus Yunker, 1970
 Horstiella Türk, 1949
 Hortacarus S. Mahunka, 1979
 Hyohondania Sasa, 1952
 Irianopus Fain, 1986
 Kanekobia Fain, C. E. Yunker, J. van Goethem & D. E. Johnston, 1982
 Kargoecius Fain, 1985
 Konoglyphus Delfinado & Baker, 1974
 Kuzinia Zachvatkin, 1941
 Lackerbaueria Zachvatkin, 1941
 Lamtoglyphus Fain, 1975
 Lasioacarus Kadzhyaya, 1968
 Lemmaniella Mahunka, 1977
 Lindquistia Mahunka, 1977
 Lowryacarus Fain, 1986
 Machadoglyphus Mahunka, 1963
 Madaglyphus Fain, 1971
 Mahunkaglyphus Eraky, 1998
 Mahunkallinia Eraky, 1999
 Mauracarus S. Mahunka, 1978
 Medeus Volgin, 1974
 Megachilopus Fain, 1974
 Mezorhizoglyphus Kadzhaya, 1966
 Mycetosancassania Klimov, 2000
 Myrmolichus Türk & Türk, 1957
 Naiacus H. H. J. Nesbitt, 1990
 Naiadacarus Fashing, 1974
 Neoacotyledon K. Samsinak, 1980
 Neohorstia Zachvatkin, 1941
 Neotropacarus Baker, 1985
 Notiopsyllopus Fain, 1977
 Ocellacarus S. Mahunka, 1979
 Olafsenia Oudemans, 1927
 Omentopus Fain, 1978
 Paraceroglyphus Fain & Beaucournu, 1979
 Paraforcellinia Kadzhaya, 1974
 Passaloglyphus Mahunka & Samsinak, 1972
 Paulacarellus Fain, 1976
 Pelzneria Scheucher, in Stammer 1957
 Pinoglyphus S. Mahunka, 1978
 Psyllacarus Fain, F. Bartholomaeus, B. Cooke & J. C. Beaucournu, 1990
 Psylloglyphus Fain, 1966
 Psyllopus Fain & J. C. Beaucournu, 1993
 Reckiacarus G. Kadzhaya, 1972
 Rettacarus S. Mahunka, 1979
 Rhizoglyphoides V. I. Volgin, 1978
 Rodionovia Zachvatkin, 1941
 Scatoglyphus Berlese, 1913
 Schulzea Zachvatkin, 1941
 Sennertionyx Zachvatkin, 1941
 Setoglyphus S. Mahunka, 1979
 Sinolardoglyphus Z. T. Jiang, 1991
 Sinosuidasia Jiang, 1996
 Spinacaropus Fain & A. M. Camerik, 1978
 Terglyphus Samsinak, 1965
 Thectochloracarus Fain, Engel, Flechtmann & OConnor, 1999
 Trichopsyllopus Fain & G. T. Baker, 1983
 Troxocoptes Fain & J. R. Philips, 1983
 Umakefeq Klimov, 2000
 Volginia Kadzhaya, 1967

References

External links

 Stuart M. Bennett (2003): Acarus siro (Flour Mite)

 
Sarcoptiformes
Acari families